Nallathai Naadu Kekum is a 1991 Indian Tamil language film starring and directed by Jeppiaar. It stars M. G. Ramachandran via archive footage. The film was released on 10 May 1991.

Plot

Cast

Production 
MGR's unfinished film in 1977 Nallathai Naadu Kekum directed by M. Karnan was incorporated into a totally new plot, resulting into this film. The M. G. Ramachandran footage includes few scenes. When this film went out, Ramachandran had died, for a little less than four years.

Soundtrack 
Music was composed by Shankar–Ganesh.

References

External links 
 

1991 films
1990s Tamil-language films
Films scored by Shankar–Ganesh